NH RSA Title III is the portion of the New Hampshire Revised Statutes Annotated having to do with the governance and regulation of cities, towns, villages and unincorporated places within the state.

RSA 49 City Managers, Now Regarding Charters
Formerly, RSA 49 was in regard to city managers, but was repealed to be diverged into several sub-chapters regarding charters for political subdivisions smaller than a county.

RSA 49A Local City Charters
The entire RSA was repealed and remade at RSA 49C.

RSA 49B Home Rule-Municipal Charters
RSA 49B consists of 13 sections which gives definitions of powers for the governing, administrative and other bodies in towns, as well as how citizens within the town and the town as a whole may enact changes to the towns' governance. RSA 49B also regards how town meetings are to be run.

RSA 49C Local Option-City Charters
Like RSA 49B, RSA49C defines the powers for governing, administrative and other bodies within cities in New Hampshire, although the 34 sections of RSA 49C also discuss other more specific topics such as mayors (towns in New Hampshire do not have mayors) among other topics.

RSA 49D Local Option-Town Charters
RSA 49D describes forms of town government available under RSA 49B such as forms of town councils or town meetings.

New Hampshire statutes